The Geelong Cricket Association is the main cricket organisation in the Geelong area. It is affiliate with Cricket Victoria.  It currently has 37 teams competing in 3 divisions as well as junior competitions.

History
The Geelong Cricket Association was first formed in 1896 with six foundation clubs Capulets, Clarendon, Geelong, Magpies, Non Descripts and Yarra Street Wesleyans.  Also successful to begin with the competition began to struggle and was forced to disband in 1913.

In 1928 the Geelong Cricket Association was reformed with six new clubs Geelong City, Geelong Footballers, Geelong West, Newtown & Chilwell, North Geelong and South Geelong forming the new competition.

As of today the competition runs 3 divisions. Turf cricket is mandatory for First and Second XI's in the First and Second Division, whilst the Third Division has a mixture of turf and hard wicket cricket.  The competition currently runs 14 grades across all divisions.

In the 2009/10 season the GCA also introduced a Twenty-20 competition spanning all divisions.

The most successful GCA club has been Newtown & Chilwell who have won 20 Division One 1st XI premierships, followed by North Geelong with 13.

North Geelong are the current reigning Division 1 premiers, their 3rd in a row after once again defeating East Belmont who they also beat in the 2020/21 grand final.

Affiliated Clubs

In 2022/23 a new 4 Division Competition began with 8 sides in each Duivision.

Premiers

References

Sport in Geelong
Cricket in Victoria (Australia)
Organisations based in Geelong
Cricket administration in Australia